Bouhouche is a surname. Notable people with the surname include:

Ammar Bouhouche, Algerian academic
Madani Bouhouche (1952-2005), Belgian gendarme

See also
Bir Bouhouche, town and comune in Souk Ahras Province, Algeria

Arabic-language surnames
Surnames of Algerian origin